Sara T. Hannan (born January 3, 1961) is a Democratic member of the Alaska Legislature representing the State's 33rd House district.

Career
Hannan won the November 2018 general election, securing fifty-six percent of the vote while her closest rival, Independent Chris Dimond, secured forty-four percent.

References

1961 births
21st-century American women politicians
21st-century American politicians
Living people
Democratic Party members of the Alaska House of Representatives
People from Juneau, Alaska
Women state legislators in Alaska